Bruce Harry Dinwiddy, CMG (1 February 1946 – 1 April 2021) was the governor of the Cayman Islands from May 2002 to October 2005.

Born in Epsom, he worked for the Foreign and Commonwealth Office (FCO) from 1973 to 2005. Before becoming a colonial administrator, he was posted to many countries around the world, and also spent time working in England.  The following is a list of jobs he has had with the FCO in the past 30 years:

 1973–1974: FCO (Central and Southern African Dept.)
 1974–1974: UK Mission CSCE, Geneva (Second Secretary)
 1974–1975: FCO (Hong Kong and Indian Ocean Dept.)
 1975–1977: UK Delegation MBFR, Vienna (First Secretary)
 1977–1981: FCO (Permanent Under Secretary's Dept.)
 1981–1983: Cairo (Head of Chancery)
 1983–1984: FCO (Personnel Operations Dept.)
 1985–1986: FCO (Assistant Head, Personnel Policy Dept.)
 1986–1988: FCO (Counsellor on loan to Cabinet Office)
 1989–1989: FCO (Career Development Attachment, Stiftung Wissenschaft und Politik, Ebenhausen)
 1989–1991: Bonn (Counsellor)
 1992–1995: Ottawa (Deputy High Commissioner)
 1995–1998: FCO (Head, African Dept (Southern), also Commissioner British Indian Ocean Territory, 1996–1998)
 1998–2001: Dar es Salaam (High Commissioner)
 2001–2002: Secondment to Standard Chartered Bank
 2002–2005: Governor and President of the Executive Council, Cayman Islands

He was married to Emma Victoria (née Llewellyn) and has one daughter (b. 1976) and one son (b. 1979).

He died on 1 April 2021 at the age of 75.

References

1946 births
2021 deaths
Companions of the Order of St Michael and St George
Governors of the Cayman Islands
High Commissioners of the United Kingdom to Tanzania
People from Epsom